Salehabad (also Romanized as Şāleḩābād) is a city and capital of Salehabad County, Razavi Khorasan Province, Iran. At the 2006 census, its population was 8,280, in 1,877 families.

References 

Populated places in   Torbat-e Jam County
Cities in Razavi Khorasan Province